This is a list of current and former company towns in Canada. True company towns are those "closed communities owned and administered by the industrial employer". Other rural communities which did not function strictly in this way but were still dominated by a single industry may also be called company towns and are featured in this list.

Their formation were common in the early and mid 20th century, with the mining and pulp and paper industries making up the bulk of the towns. Many of these towns were planned communities, with their developers choosing for them unique design plans, such as the Garden city movement in the case of Kapuskasing, Ontario and Kitimat, British Columbia.

Few company towns remain in Canada, as most have been abandoned or since incorporated into a municipality. The only remaining example of a company town today may be Churchill Falls, Newfoundland and Labrador, an unincorporated community home to Nalcor Energy’s Churchill Falls Generating Station.

British Columbia

Manitoba

Newfoundland and Labrador

Nova Scotia

Nunavut

Ontario

Quebec

Saskatchewan

Yukon

See also 

 Category:Company towns in Canada
 List of canning towns in British Columbia
 List of historic mining communities
 List of Hudson's Bay Company trading posts
 List of planned cities in Canada

References

Company towns
Canada